Wrightoporia unguliformis is a species of fungus in the family Bondarzewiaceae. Described as new to science in 2006, it is found in southern China.

Description
The pore surface is buff to pale brown, and it has thick tube mouths. It has a dimitic hyphal system, with dextrinoid skeletal hyphae. The fungus causes a white rot on angiosperms.

References

External links

Fungi described in 1996
Fungi of China
Russulales
Taxa named by Yu-Cheng Dai
Taxa named by Bao-Kai Cui